The Robinson Road is a historical road in the US state of Mississippi. It ran from Columbus to Natchez.

The road appeared on a map of Mississippi from 1831 that illustrated the Robinson Road extending from Columbus to the Natchez Trace near Wiggins in Leake County.

From Columbus, the road traversed through Agency in Oktibbeha County, on to Louisville, on to Carthage, and then to Canton and Jackson.

The Robinson Road was designated as a mail route in 1822, which diverted northern Mississippi traffic from the Natchez Trace. The United States government appropriated funds to improve Robinson Road in 1823, as did the Mississippi Legislature in 1824, as the road served as the only contemporary route that connected Jackson to settlements along the Tombigbee River.

Portions of the road are on the National Register of Historic Places in Winston and Leake counties. A historical marker that gives a description of the road is located on the Natchez Trace at mile marker 135.

References

Historic trails and roads in Mississippi